Cameron's may refer to:
 Cameron's Books and Magazines, Portland, Oregon, United States
 Cameron's Seafood Market, Rockville, Maryland, United States
 Camerons Brewery, United Kingdom

See also
 Camerons (disambiguation)